Louisa County is the name of two counties in the United States of America:
 Louisa County, Iowa
 Louisa County, Virginia